Yunnan Lijiang Dongba (Simplified Chinese: 云南丽江东巴) was a Chinese football club based in Yunnan, China. It competed in the China League Two between 2004 and 2006.

After Yunnan Hongta was merged with Chongqing Lifan at the end of the 2003 season, a lot of Yunnan players became expandable and were seeking playing opportunities elsewhere. In February 2004 Yunnan Lijiang Dongba was established and was mainly consisted of the reserve team members of Yunnan Hongta and ranked third in the China League Two. After failing to gain promotion from the League Two in 2006, the team was disbanded.

References

External links
 Official Website

Defunct football clubs in China
Football clubs in China
Sport in Yunnan